Janelle Cherie Falzon, OAM (born  4 April 1981) is an Australian paralympic swimmer. She was born in Sydney, New South Wales.  At the 1996 Summer Paralympics, she won a gold medal in the Women's 4 × 100 m Freestyle S7-10 event, for which she won a Medal of the Order of Australia, and two bronze medals in the Women's 100 m Backstroke S8 and Women's 400 m Freestyle S8 events.  At the 1996 games, she competed in but did not medal in the 	Women's 100 m Freestyle S8 event, the Women's 200 m Medley SM8 event, and the Women's 4 × 100 m Medley S7-10 event. At the 2000 Games, she competed in the  100 m Backstroke S8	event, the 100 m Freestyle S8 event, the 400 m Freestyle S8 event and the   50 m Freestyle S8 event, but did not win any medals at those Games. In 2000, she received an Australian Sports Medal.

References

Female Paralympic swimmers of Australia
Paralympic gold medalists for Australia
Paralympic bronze medalists for Australia
Swimmers at the 1996 Summer Paralympics
Swimmers at the 2000 Summer Paralympics
Recipients of the Medal of the Order of Australia
Recipients of the Australian Sports Medal
1981 births
Living people
Medalists at the 1996 Summer Paralympics
Paralympic medalists in swimming
Australian female freestyle swimmers
Swimmers from Sydney
S8-classified Paralympic swimmers
Medalists at the World Para Swimming Championships
20th-century Australian women